Jenny Runacre (born 18 August 1946) is a South African-born English actress. Her film appearances include The Passenger (1975), The Duellists (1977), Jubilee (1978), The Lady Vanishes (1979), and The Witches (1990).

Career
Runacre was born in Cape Town, South Africa. She moved to London as a child, attended the Actors' Workshop there, and trained in the Stanislavski System.

While attending the Actors' Workshop, Runacre was approached by fellow student (and future agent) Tom Busby, who was working as a runner for an American film production that was seeking fledgling English actresses to play opposite John Cassavetes in Husbands, a film to be shot the following year in London. The young actress auditioned with Cassavetes, Ben Gazzara and Peter Falk, and was told six weeks later that she was being offered the part of Mary Tynan in the film. Runacre accepted the offer and Husbands became her first important film role.

Runacre then joined the original London cast of Oh! Calcutta!. Runacre left the cast after a year and starred in such films as Pier Paolo Pasolini's The Canterbury Tales, John Huston's The Mackintosh Man, Robert Fuest's The Final Programme, Michelangelo Antonioni's The Passenger, and Derek Jarman's Jubilee, in which she starred as Elizabeth I and "Bod". She was active in the theatre as well as on British television, including an appearance as an art con artist in an episode of Lovejoy as well as playing Brenda Champion in the noted series Brideshead Revisited.

Runacre focused on higher education in the 1990s. She has a Master's in Fine Art Practice from Central Saint Martin's College of Art and Design. She is currently a lecturer in residence in art, and has worked in installation art and experimental filmmaking.

In 2007, Runacre directed Gareth Parker and Andrew Swann's Frozen, which was nominated for Best Direction, Best Writing and Best Overall Production in the LOST Theatre Festival. She also directed the Wireless Theatre Company's audio adaption of Frozen after its successful stage run, featuring the original cast. In 2008, Jenny made her Edinburgh Fringe directing debut with Gullibility Factor by Peter Yates.

In 2008, Jenny appeared in John Maybury's The Edge of Love (2008) and starred as Alice in Volcano Theatre Company's National tour of Alice in Wonderland.

Selected filmography
 Goodbye, Mr. Chips (1969)
 Husbands (1970) – Mary Tynan
 Dyn Amo (1972) – 1st Girl
 The Canterbury Tales (1972) – Alison
 The Creeping Flesh (1973) – Emmanuel's Wife
 The MacKintosh Man (1973) – Gerda
 The Final Programme (1973) – Miss Brunner
 Son of Dracula (1974) – Woman in Black
 All Creatures Great and Small (1975) – Pamela
 The Passenger (1975) – Rachel
 L'Évasion de Hassan Terro (1976)
 Joseph Andrews (1977) – The Gypsy
 Spectre (1977) – Sydna
 The Duellists (1977) – Mme. de Lionne
 Three Dangerous Ladies (1977) – Mrs. Santander (segment "The Island")
 Jubilee (1978) – Queen Elizabeth I / Bod
 The Sweeney (1978) episode "the bigger they are".
 The Lady Vanishes (1979) – Mrs. Todhunter
 Hussy (1980) – Vere
 The Optimist (1985) - Mrs. Big
 Brideshead Revisited (1981) – Brenda Champion
 Shadey (1985) – Shop assistant
 That Englishwoman (1990) – Lady Mary Hobhouse
 The Witches (1990) – Elsie
 Restoration (1995) – Painter Lady
 The Edge of Love (2008) – Woman in Yellow Dress
 Boogie Woogie (2009) – Mrs. Havermeyer
 Camberwell Beauty (2015) – Dominique
 Meet Pursuit Delange: The Movie (2015) – Miss Haversham
 Perfect Piece (2016) – Mrs. Di Grazia

References

External links
 
 Jenny Runacre on the British Film Institute website
 Jenny Runacre on the Wireless Theatre Company website
 Jenny Runacre's personal website

1946 births
Living people
English film actresses
English stage actresses
English television actresses
Actresses from Cape Town
English people of South African descent
South African emigrants to the United Kingdom